George Hewett (born 29 December 1995) is a professional Australian rules footballer playing for the Carlton Football Club in the Australian Football League (AFL), having been initially drafted to the Sydney Swans. Started in Port Broughton. He was drafted with pick 32 in the 2013 AFL draft by Sydney. He attended Prince Alfred College and graduated in 2013.

AFL career
Originally a midfielder, Hewett moved into the forward line in order to better his chances of senior selection, being unable to break into the Swans star studded mid-field. Hewett made his AFL debut in round 1 of the 2016 AFL season against . He would play all but two games that year, including the grand final. His best individual performance was against , where he kicked three goals in the first quarter.

After eight years with the Swans, Hewett exercised his rights as a free agent and joined  at the conclusion of the 2021 AFL season. He became a key part of Carlton's inside midfield team upon joining the Blues, and finished fifth in the club's best and fairest in his first season.

Statistics
 Statistics are correct to the end of round 18, 2022

|- style="background-color: #EAEAEA"
! scope="row" style="text-align:center" | 2016
|
| 29 || 24 || 18 || 8 || 148 || 163 || 311 || 68 || 84 || 0.8 || 0.3 || 6.2 || 6.8 || 13.0 || 2.8 || 3.5
|- 
! scope="row" style="text-align:center" | 2017
|
| 29 || 24 || 9 || 6 || 199 || 250 || 449 || 86 || 115 || 0.4 || 0.3 || 8.3 || 10.4 || 18.7 || 3.6 || 4.8
|- style="background-color: #EAEAEA"
! scope="row" style="text-align:center" | 2018
|
| 29 || 23 || 3 || 3 || 170 || 259 || 429 || 51 || 90 || 0.1 || 0.1 || 7.4 || 11.3 || 18.7 || 2.2 || 3.9
|- 
! scope="row" style="text-align:center" | 2019
|
| 29 || 22 || 1 || 0 || 190 || 291 || 429 || 56 || 98 || 0.1 || 0.0 || 8.6 || 13.2 || 21.9 || 2.6 || 4.5
|- style="background-color: #EAEAEA"
! scope="row" style="text-align:center" | 2020
|
| 29 || 6 || 1 || 0 || 29 || 54 || 83 || 11 || 19 || 0.2 || 0.0 || 4.8 || 9.0 || 13.8 || 1.8 || 3.2
|- 
! scope="row" style="text-align:center" | 2021
|
| 29 || 21 || 0 || 0 || 160 || 216 || 376 || 74 || 71 || 0.0 || 0.0 || 7.6 || 10.3 || 17.9 || 3.5 || 3.4
|- style="background-color: #EAEAEA"
! scope="row" style="text-align:center" | 2022
|
| 29 || 15 || 4 || 5 || 170 || 257 || 427 || 51 || 73 || 0.2 || 0.3 || 11.3 || 17.1 || 28.4 || 3.4 || 4.8
|- class="sortbottom"
! colspan=3| Career
! 135
! 36
! 22
! 1066
! 1491
! 2557
! 397
! 548
! 0.2
! 0.1
! 7.8
! 11.0
! 18.9
! 2.9
! 4.0
|}

References

External links

Living people
1995 births
North Adelaide Football Club players
Australian rules footballers from South Australia
Sydney Swans players
Carlton Football Club players